The Yukon Green Party was a territorial green political party in Yukon, Canada. It was inspired by the Green Party of Canada.

Its first leader was Kristina Calhoun, a stay-at-home mother, who has lived in Yukon since 2006. The party began at a meeting in November 2010, and was registered in February 2011.

Frank de Jong led the party as its interim leader in the 2016 general election. Its platform in that election included electoral reform, legalizing marijuana, ending public funding for Catholic schools, and introducing a carbon tax in Yukon that would be offset by monthly refund payments to Yukoners.

Frank de Jong has since moved out of Yukon. The party wanted to elect a new leader at a future annual general meeting, but ultimately failed to do so.

The party did not run any candidates in the 2021 Yukon general election, and as a result was deregisted by Elections Yukon.

Platform 
The party was in favour of:

 Defunding Catholic schools
 Banning wet tailings dams
 Proportional representation
 Yukon-wide public transit

Electoral record

Party leaders 

 Kristina Calhoun, 2011–2016
 Frank de Jong, 2016–2019

See also 
 List of political parties in Yukon
 List of Yukon general elections
 Politics of Yukon

References

External links 
 

 
2011 establishments in Yukon
Political parties established in 2011
Political parties disestablished in 2021
Territorial political parties in Yukon